The following is a list of Michigan State Historic Sites in Barry County, Michigan. Sites marked with a dagger (†) are also listed on the National Register of Historic Places in Barry County, Michigan.


Current listings

See also
 National Register of Historic Places listings in Barry County, Michigan

Sources
 Historic Sites Online – Barry County. Michigan State Housing Developmental Authority. Accessed January 23, 2011.

References

Barry County
State Historic Sites
Tourist attractions in Barry County, Michigan